CD Genomics, a genomics services company, provides sequencing services, genotyping and library construction by developing integrated systems of genomic products and services. The company sells products in the United States, Europe, and Asia. Scientists from CD Genomics have participated in many genome projects, such as Illumina, the genome sequence, DNA analyzer, Bacillus thuringiensis, Thermoanaerobacter tengcongensis, Streptococcus suis, and quite a few virus genomes.

Founding
CD Genomics, is a next-generation sequencing provider that was established in 2004. Equipped with both traditional and modern genotyping platforms, the company is headquartered in Shirley, New York. It also maintains operations in North Carolina, Europe and Asia. In 2007, CD Genomics expanded its services to molecular biology research.

References

External links
 CD Genomics' website

Genomics companies
Biotechnology companies of the United States
Biotechnology companies established in 2004
2004 establishments in New York City